The 199th New York State Legislature, consisting of the New York State Senate and the New York State Assembly, met from January 5, 2011, to December 31, 2012, during the first two years of Andrew Cuomo's governorship, in Albany.

State Senate
An extraordinary session of the State Senate was held on December 7, 2011 to codify a tax code reform promoted by Cuomo.

Senators
The asterisk (*) denotes members of the previous Legislature who continued in office as members of this Legislature. Michael Gianaris, Adriano Espaillat, Greg Ball and Tom O'Mara changed from the Assembly to the Senate.

Note: For brevity, the chairmanships omit the words "...the Committee on (the)..."

Employees
 Secretary: ?

State Assembly

Assembly members
The asterisk (*) denotes members of the previous Legislature who continued in office as members of this Legislature.

Note: For brevity, the chairmanships omit the words "...the Committee on (the)..."

Employees
 Clerk: ?

References

Sources
 Senate election results at NYS Board of Elections
 Assembly election results at NYS Board of Elections
 September 13, 2011, special election results at NYS Board of Elections

199
2011 politics in New York (state)
2012 politics in New York (state)
Independent Democratic Conference
2011 U.S. legislative sessions
2012 U.S. legislative sessions